Kiss, Kicks is the first single album by South Korean girl group Weki Meki. It was released on October 11, 2018, by Fantagio Music and distributed by Interpark. It consists of three songs, including the title track "Crush".

Background 
On September 22, 2018, it was announced that the group would release their first single album, Kiss, Kicks, on October 11 with a teen crush concept. On October 5, a 'highlight medley' was released, revealing snippets for the three songs.

Track listing

Charts

References 

2018 singles
Single albums
Weki Meki albums